Molekel is a free software multiplatform molecular visualization program. It was originally developed at the University of Geneva by Peter F. Flükiger in the 1990s for Silicon Graphics Computers. In 1998, Stefan Portmann took over responsibility and released Version 3.0. Version 4.0 was a nearly platform independent version. Further developments lead to version 4.3, before Stefan Portmann moved on and ceased to develop the codes. In 2006, the Swiss National Supercomputing Centre (CSCS) restarted the project and version 5.0 was released on 21 December 2006.

Molekel uses VTK and Qwt and therefore as well Qt.

Major features
 Visualization of residues (ribbon or schematic)
 Complete control over the generation of molecular surfaces (bounding box and resolution)
 Visualization of the following surfaces:
 orbitals
 Isosurface from electron density data
 Isosurface from Gaussian cube grid data
 Solvent-accessible surface (SAS)
 Solvent excluded surface (SES)
 Van der Waals radii
 Animation of molecular surfaces
 Export to PostScript or TIFF

See also

 Gabedit
 List of molecular graphics systems
 Molden
 Molecular graphics
 Software for molecular mechanics modeling
 SAMSON
List of free and open-source software packages

References

External links
 Molekel home page

Chemistry software for Linux
Free chemistry software
Molecular modelling software
Science software that uses Qt
Software that uses VTK